Climate change in South Asia is having significant impacts already which are expected to intensify as global temperatures rise due to climate change. The South Asia region consists of the eight countries Afghanistan, Pakistan, India, Nepal, Bhutan, Bangladesh, the Maldives and Sri Lanka. In the 2017 edition of Germanwatch's Climate Risk Index, Bangladesh and Pakistan ranked sixth and seventh respectively as the countries most affected by climate change in the period from 1996 to 2015, while India ranked fourth among the list of countries most affected by climate change in 2015. South Asia is one of the most vulnerable regions globally to a number of direct and indirect effects of climate change, including sea level rise, cyclonic activity, and changes in ambient temperature and precipitation patterns. Ongoing sea level rise has already submerged several low-lying islands in the Sundarbans region, displacing thousands of people.

Among the countries of South Asia, Bangladesh is likely to be the worst affected by climate change. This is owing to a combination of geographical factors, such as its flat, low-lying, and delta-exposed topography, and socio-economic factors, including its high population density, levels of poverty, and dependence on agriculture. Its sea level, temperature, and evaporation are increasing, and the changes in precipitation and cross-boundary river flows are already beginning to cause drainage congestion. There is a reduction in freshwater availability, disturbance of morphological processes, and a higher intensity of flooding.

Greenhouse gas emissions 
Bangladesh only contributes 0.21% of the world's emissions yet it has 2.11% of the world's population. In contrast, the United States makes up about 4.25 percent of the world's population, yet they produce approximately 15 percent of the pollution that causes global warming.

Impacts on the natural environment

Temperature and weather changes

Regarding local temperature rises, the IPCC figure shows that mean annual value of temperature rise by the end of the century in South Asia is 3.3 °C with the min-max range as 2.7 – 4.7 °C. The mean value for Tibet would be higher with mean increase of 3.8 °C and min-max figures of 2.6 and 6.1 °C respectively, which implies harsher warming conditions for the Himalayan watersheds.

Extreme weather events
Increased landslides and flooding are projected to have an impact upon states such as Assam. Ecological disasters, such as a 1998 coral bleaching event that killed off more than 70% of corals in the reef ecosystems off Lakshadweep and the Andamans, and was brought on by elevated ocean temperatures tied to global warming, are also projected to become increasingly common.

Sea level rise 
The global average sea level rose by 3.1 mm per year from 1993 to 2003. More recent analysis of a number of semi empirical models predict a sea level rise of about 1 metre by the year 2100.
 
Ongoing sea level rises have already submerged several low-lying islands in the Sundarbans, displacing thousands of people. Temperature rises on the Tibetan Plateau are causing Himalayan glaciers to retreat. It has been predicted that the historical city of Thatta and Badin, in Sindh, Pakistan would have been swallowed by the sea by 2025, as the sea is already encroaching 80 acres of land here, every day. 

Some territories in India were already evacuated due to increase in tidal flooding. Large part of some Indian cities will be below tide-level by 2030: Mumbai, Kolkata, Cuttack, Kochi and more. Navi Mumbai will be below this level almost entirely.

In October 2019, a study was published in the Nature Communications journal. The journal claims that the number of people who will be impacted from sea level rise during 21st century is 3 times higher than the previous expected number. By 2050, 150 million will be under the water line during high tide and 300 million will live in zones with flooding every year. By the year 2100, those numbers differ sharply depending on the emission scenario. In a low emission scenario, 140 million will be under water during high tide and 280 million will have flooding each year. In high emission scenario, the numbers reach up to 540 million and 640 million, respectively. 70% of these people will live in 8 countries in Asia: China, Bangladesh, India, Indonesia, Thailand, Vietnam, Japan, and the Philippines. Large parts of Ho Chi Minh City, Mumbai, Shanghai, Bangkok and Basra could be inundated.

Population that will live in a zone of annual flooding by 2050 in millions, in 6 countries in Asia, according to old and new estimates:

Impacts on people

Economic impacts 

India has the world's highest social cost of carbon. The Indira Gandhi Institute of Development Research has reported that, if the predictions relating to global warming made by the Intergovernmental Panel on Climate Change come to fruition, climate-related factors could cause India's GDP to decline by up to 9%; contributing to this would be shifting growing seasons for major crops such as rice, production of which could fall by 40%. Around seven million people are projected to be displaced due to, among other factors, submersion of parts of Mumbai and Chennai, if global temperatures were to rise by a mere 2 °C (3.6 °F).

If severe climate changes occur, Bangladesh will lose land along the coast line. This will be highly damaging to Bangladeshis especially because about 50% population of Bangladeshis are employed in the agriculture sector, with rice as the largest production. If no further steps are taken to improve the current conditions global warming will affect the economy severely worsening the present issues further. The climate change would increase expenditure towards health care, cool drinks, alcoholic beverages, air conditioners, ice cream, cosmetics, agricultural chemicals, and other products.

Agriculture 
Climate Change in India and Pakistan will have a disproportionate impact on the more than 400 million that make up India's poor. This is because so many depend on natural resources for their food, shelter and income. More than 56% of people in India work in agriculture, while in Pakistan 43℅ of its population work in agriculture while many others earn their living in coastal areas.

Health impacts

Heat waves 
Heat waves' frequency and power are increasing in India because of climate change. The number of heat wave days has increased — not just day temperature, night temperatures increased also. 2018 was the country's sixth hottest year on record, and 11 of its 15 warmest years have occurred since 2004. The capital New Delhi broke its all-time record with a high of 48 degrees Celsius. The government is being advised by the Indian Institute of Tropical Meteorology in predicting and mitigating heat waves. The government of Andhra Pradesh, for instance, is creating a Heat Wave Action Plan.

Impacts on migration 
Villagers in India's North Eastern state of Meghalaya are also concerned that rising sea levels will submerge neighboring low-lying Bangladesh, resulting in an influx of refugees into Meghalaya which has few resources to handle such a situation.

Mitigation and adaptation 

There are many concrete steps which can be taken to address the threat of climate change. Incentives can be provided for electric vehicles or public transport and this curb the impact of the transportation sector. However, though these suggestions have been made, there is no political will to carry them out. Households can be given electricity and slowly phasing out LPG (the current trend is to increase the usage of the latter). Rainwater can be harvested and the rivers could be restored to their original flow so that they can bring back the wetlands and the natural ways of silt, nutrient and wildlife flow. All of these use technologies and can be implemented by the 11-year period the IPCC has stipulated before which any change must be made if we are to evade the adverse effects of climate change. So far, though the initiatives by the Delhi Metro to switch to solar power- or similar efforts by Kochi airport-are a step in the right direction, such moves are few and far between. These models should be taken up by other agents as well.

The latest accord, the 2015 Paris Agreement, takes a different approach. The 197 signatory countries have promised to limit global temperature increase to just 1.5 °C over pre-industrialization levels, but each country has set its own targets. India, for instance, has promised to cut its emissions intensity (emissions per unit of GDP) by 33-35% by 2030 compared to 2005 levels (Chart 1a/ 1b).

Adaptation
The Asia-Pacific Climate Change Adaption Information Platform (AP-PLAT) was launched in 2019. It aims to provide Asia and Pacific countries with data on climate change and convert it to adaptation and resilience measures.

Climate change by South Asian country

Afghanistan

Bangladesh

Bhutan

India

Maldives

Nepal

Pakistan

Sri Lanka

See also 

 Environment of India
 Energy policy of India
 Climate change in China
 Asian brown cloud
 Indian Network on Climate Change Assessment (INCCA)

References

Notes

External links 

 Climate Change India
Fighting Global Warming in India
 Global Warming and its effects in South Asian Countries
 
 
 
 
 

Environment of South Asia
South Asia
South Asia